North Myrtle Beach is a city in Horry County, South Carolina, United States. It serves as one of the primary tourist destinations along the Grand Strand. As of the 2010 census, the population was 13,752, and in 2019 the estimated population was 16,819. It is part of the Myrtle Beach–Conway–North Myrtle Beach Metropolitan Area, which had a combined population of 449,295 as of 2016.

History
He farmed the area and also established a tavern for travelers along the Kings Highway.

North Myrtle Beach was created in 1968 with the consolidation of Cherry Grove Beach, Crescent Beach, Ocean Drive Beach, and Windy Hill Beach.

Geography 
North Myrtle Beach is located in eastern Horry County. It is bordered to the southwest by Briarcliffe Acres and to the northeast by Little River.

The area is divided into four separate areas based on its former municipalities. These are Windy Hill, Crescent Beach, Ocean Drive, and Cherry Grove, a spit bordering North Carolina. Atlantic Beach, which is bordered on three sides by North Myrtle Beach, chose to remain its own town during the merger.

Neighborhoods 
 Barefoot
 Cherry Grove Beach
 Crescent Beach
 Ingram Beach
 Little River Neck
 Ocean Creek
 Ocean Drive Beach
 Seabrook Plantation
 Tidewater
 Windy Hill Beach

Demographics

2020 census

As of the 2020 United States census, there were 18,790 people, 7,558 households, and 4,583 families residing in the city.

2000 census
As of the census of 2000, there were 10,974 people, 5,406 households, and 3,130 families residing in the city. The population density was 841.6 people per square mile (324.9/km2). There were 18,091 housing units at an average density of 1,387.5 per square mile (535.7/km2). The racial makeup of the city was 94.50% White, 2.31% African American, 0.47% Native American, 0.64% Asian, 0.14% Pacific Islander, 1.06% from other races, and 0.89% from two or more races. Hispanic or Latino of any race were 2.36% of the population.

There were 5,406 households, out of which 15.1% had children under the age of 18 living with them, 47.5% were married couples living together, 6.9% had a female householder with no husband present, and 42.1% were non-families. 33.2% of all households were made up of individuals, and 11.0% had someone living alone who was 65 years of age or older. The average household size was 2.03 and the average family size was 2.53.

In the city, the population distribution by age was 13.8% under the age of 18, 6.1% from 18 to 24, 25.9% from 25 to 44, 32.8% from 45 to 64, and 21.5% who were 65 years of age or older. The median age was 48 years. For every 100 females, there were 99.5 males. For every 100 females age 18 and over, there were 98.2 males.

The median income for a household in the city was $38,787, and the median income for a family was $46,052. Males had a median income of $30,189 versus $22,119 for females. The per capita income for the city was $27,006. About 5.1% of families and 8.5% of the population were below the poverty line, including 12.8% of those under age 18 and 4.8% of those age 65 or over.

Arts and culture
North Myrtle Beach has a public library, a branch of the Horry County Memorial Library.

Government 
North Myrtle Beach adheres to the Council-Manager form of government. The current mayor is Marilyn Hatley. The current council members are Terry White (Mayor pro tempore), J.O. Baldwin, Trey Skidmore, Nikki Fontana, Hank Thomas, and Fred Coyne. The current City Manager is Michael Mahaney.

Education 
 Ocean Drive Elementary School
 Riverside Elementary School
 Waterway Elementary School
 North Myrtle Beach Middle School
 North Myrtle Beach High School (in nearby Little River)

Infrastructure

Transportation

Road
  US 17
  SC 9
  SC 31
  SC 65 (Ocean Blvd)
  SC 90
 Robert Edge Parkway

Air
North Myrtle Beach is home to a single terminal, the Grand Strand Airport, serving primarily banner planes and small aircraft. The airfield is located in the heart of the city. The airport generates over $10.1 million in local economic output.

Bus
North Myrtle Beach is served by the Coast RTA, formerly Waccamaw RTA or Lymo.

Notable people
Alyssa Arce, fashion model, Playboy Playmate for July 2013
Ryan Quigley - football punter who has played for the Minnesota Vikings, Jacksonville Jaguars, Chicago Bears, New York Jets, and Philadelphia Eagles.
Lou Saban, former football coach; lived here until his death
Kelly Tilghman, Golf Channel broadcaster and PGA Tour's first female lead golf announcer
Vanna White, television personality known for co-hosting Wheel of Fortune

References

External links 

 City of North Myrtle Beach official website
 

 
Cities in South Carolina
Myrtle Beach metropolitan area
Cities in Horry County, South Carolina
Populated coastal places in South Carolina